Charlie Dixon (born 23 September 1990) is an Australian rules footballer playing for the Port Adelaide Football Club in the Australian Football League (AFL). He was recruited by the Gold Coast Football Club as a Queensland zoned selection made available to Gold Coast under the AFL's draft concessions. He scored the first ever goal in the history of the club on 2 April 2011 against .

Early life
Dixon was born and raised in Cairns, Queensland. His parents both played basketball in their younger years and Charlie began playing basketball at the age of four where he made several junior representative sides through the eight years he played the sport.

Junior football
Dixon began playing junior football with the Redlynch Lions Football Club in 2003. He would then join the Cairns Saints Football Club and made the seniors team at the age of 16. In his last game for the Saints he played in the 2007 AFL Cairns Grand Final on his 17th birthday, the Saints would finish runners-up.

Following graduation from high school at the end of 2007 he and his brother moved to Brisbane where they were invited to play for the Redland Bombers in the AFL Queensland State League. He worked his way through the Redland ranks before playing for the senior side in 2008. In August 2008, Dixon was the first player ever to sign a contract with the newly formed Gold Coast Football Club for their inaugural year in the TAC Cup. At the beginning of the 2009 TAC Cup season, Dixon was named vice-captain of the club. He played 15 games for the season and also represented the Queensland under 18 teams in the AFL Under 18 Championships 3 times and was a standout.

Dixon's efforts in 2009 would see him officially drafted to the Gold Coast team at the start of 2010 by way of the local talent access selection. In the 2010 season with the Gold Coast competing in the Victorian Football League, Dixon was again a standout when he finished the year with 22 goals from 14 games. Halfway through the season Dixon broke the player's code and was sent down to play for the Labrador Tigers for one match before returning to the VFL. He, along with teammate Brandon Matera, were the two leading goalkickers for the Suns in the 2010 VFL season.

AFL career

Gold Coast
He made his debut in Round 2, 2011 in the Gold Coast Suns inaugural AFL match against Carlton at the Gabba, with Dixon kicking two of the Sun's goals in their heavy loss, including the first goal ever for the Suns. Two weeks later it was found that Dixon had been playing half-blind his entire football career and required contact lenses. In Round 5, wearing contacts for the first time, Dixon was part of the Gold Coast Sun's first AFL victory over Port Adelaide at AAMI Stadium and kicked two goals during the win. He would continue to play each game until round 6 when the Suns suffered their second-worst loss to date, a 139-point loss to the Essendon Bombers. Dixon was subsequently dropped and struggled to regain fitness which would only see him return to the senior side five more times for the season. He ended the 2011 season with 6 goals from 10 games.

Following the 2012 pre-season in which Dixon raced the clock to gain fitness, he managed to shed 5 kg and would return in round 5 against the North Melbourne Kangaroos, kicking two goals in the process. He was then tested in the ruck position for the next few games. In round 7 he suffered a soft tissue injury that would rule him out for 7 games. Upon return Dixon was tried in defence for the Suns and subsequently shone in the following weeks against the likes of Tom Hawkins, Jack Riewoldt and Jonathan Brown.

On 4 July 2015, in a win over North Melbourne, Dixon became the first Suns player to kick seven goals in a game.

Port Adelaide
At the end of the 2020 AFL season, Dixon finished outright second in the Coleman Medal and earned his first All-Australian selection.

Statistics
 Statistics are correct to the end of round 22, 2022

|- style="background-color: #EAEAEA"
! scope="row" style="text-align:center" | 2011
|
| 23 || 10 || 6 || 4 || 39 || 38 || 77 || 14 || 18 || 9 || 0.6 || 0.4 || 3.9 || 3.8 || 7.7 || 1.4 || 1.8 || 0.9 || 0
|- 
! scope="row" style="text-align:center" | 2012
|
| 23 || 12 || 4 || 6 || 89 || 62 || 151 || 48 || 21 || 93 || 0.3 || 0.5 || 7.4 || 5.2 || 12.6 || 4.0 || 1.8 || 7.8 || 0
|- 
|- style="background-color: #EAEAEA"
! scope="row" style="text-align:center" | 2013
|
| 23 || 13 || 19 || 7 || 93 || 73 || 166 || 42 || 31 || 135 || 1.5 || 0.5 || 7.2 || 5.6 || 12.8 || 3.2 || 2.4 || 10.4 || 4
|- 
! scope="row" style="text-align:center" | 2014
|
| 23 || 14 || 24 || 9 || 74 || 55 || 129 || 37 || 28 || 69 || 1.7 || 0.6 || 5.3 || 3.9 || 9.2 || 2.6 || 2.0 || 4.9 || 0
|- style="background-color: #EAEAEA"
! scope="row" style="text-align:center" | 2015
|
| 23 || 16 || 41 || 15 || 102 || 49 || 151 || 59 || 27 || 32 || 2.6 || 0.9 || 6.4 || 3.1 || 9.4 || 3.7 || 1.7 || 2.0 || 6
|- 
! scope="row" style="text-align:center" | 2016
|
| 22 || 18 || 30 || 16 || 102 || 103 || 205 || 70 || 31 || 21 || 1.7 || 0.9 || 5.7 || 5.7 || 11.4 || 3.9 || 1.7 || 1.2 || 2
|- style="background-color: #EAEAEA"
! scope="row" style="text-align:center" | 2017
|
| 22 || 23 || 49 || 30 || 218 || 117 || 335 || 149 || 71 || 29 || 2.1 || 1.3 || 9.5 || 5.1 || 14.6 || 6.5 || 3.1 || 1.3 || 8
|- 
! scope="row" style="text-align:center" | 2018
|
| 22 || 20 || 26 || 24 || 158 || 107 || 265 || 82 || 51 || 159 || 1.3 || 1.2 || 7.9 || 5.6 || 13.3 || 4.1 || 2.6 || 8.0 || 3
|- style="background-color: #EAEAEA
! scope="row" style="text-align:center" | 2019
|
| 22 || 9 || 13 || 11 || 61 || 40 || 101 || 29 || 19 || 23 || 1.4 || 1.2 || 6.8 || 4.4 || 11.2 || 3.2 || 2.1 || 2.6 || 0
|- 
! scope="row" style="text-align:center" | 2020
|
| 22 || 18 || 34 || 21 || 110 || 60 || 170 || 69 || 30 || 46 || 1.9 || 1.2 || 6.1 || 3.3 || 9.4 || 3.8 || 1.7 || 2.6 || 9
|- style="background-color: #EAEAEA
! scope="row" style="text-align:center" | 2021
|
| 22 || 24 || 48 || 24 || 178 || 117 || 295 || 97 || 50 || 104 || 2.0 || 1.0 || 7.4 || 4.9 || 12.3 || 4.0 || 2.1 || 4.3 || 3
|- 
! scope="row" style="text-align:center" | 2022
|
| 22 || 11 || 16 || 7 || 84 || 72 || 156 || 37 || 24 || 81 || 1.5 || 0.6 || 7.6 || 6.6 || 14.2 || 3.4 || 2.2 || 7.4 ||
|- class="sortbottom"
! colspan=3| Career
! 188
! 310
! 174
! 1308
! 893
! 2201
! 733
! 401
! 801
! 1.7
! 0.9
! 7.0
! 4.8
! 11.7
! 3.9
! 2.1
! 4.3
! 35
|}

Notes

References

External links

1990 births
Living people
Gold Coast Football Club players
Australian rules footballers from Queensland
Redland Football Club players
Labrador Australian Football Club players
Port Adelaide Football Club players
Port Adelaide Football Club players (all competitions)
All-Australians (AFL)